Siyouni (foaled 14 February 2007) is a French bred and French trained Thoroughbred racehorse and sire. In a career which ran from May 2009 to October 2010 he ran twelve times and won four races, including one at the highest Group One level. He showed promise as a juvenile winning four of his six races including the Prix Jean-Luc Lagardère on his final start of the year. The following year he never managed to repeat his juvenile forming finishing a best second place in the Prix Jean Prat, before being retired to stud.

Background
Siyouni, a bay horse standing 16.1 hands high, was bred in France by the Aga Khan IV. Siyouni was sired by the three times Leading broodmare sire in Great Britain and Ireland  Pivotal out of Listed winning mare Schilla. the colt was sent into training with Alain de Royer-Dupré in Chantilly.

Racing career

2009: two-year-old season
Siyouni made his racecourse debut in a new arrival race over five furlongs with Christophe Soumillon onboard at Longchamp Racecourse on the 4th May, winning by one and half lengths. Twenty-three days later he reappeared in a five furlongs race to win his second race from two starts. Siyouni was stepped up in class on his third start, racing in the Listed Prix La Flèche at Maisons-Laffitte Racecourse he started at odds of 7/10 winning "easily" by 3 lengths. His next race saw him enter into a Group Two race contesting the Prix Robert Papin over five and half furlongs, although set off odds on favourite Siyouni finished second to Second Duty by one and a half lengths. The fifth race of his juvenile campaign saw Siyouni stepped up in trip to seven furlongs but down in class for the Group Three Prix La Rochette, held up in the rear during the race Siyouni was ridden to second place a furlong out but could find no extra and finished behind the winner by one and half lengths. On final appearance of 2009 Siyouni contested the Group One Prix Jean-Luc Lagardère this time with Gérald Mossé onboard for the first time, sent off at odds of 7/1 Siyouni took the lead one and half furlongs from home and won out comfortably by one and a half lengths.

2010: three-year-old season
Siyouni began his 2010 three-year old campaign favourite for the Poule d'Essai des Poulains, he began in a Group Three trial for the French Guineas the Prix De Fontainebleau, finishing second behind his stable mate Rajsaman who was also owned by the Aga Khan IV. On May 16th Siyouni lined up for Poule d'Essai des Poulains going off 2/1 favourite for the race, this time with Christophe Lemaire onboard the colt was held up towards the rear but could never mount a serious challenge finishing a disappointing ninth of fifteen runners. Siyouni was then sent to Royal Ascot to run in the St James's Palace Stakes, he came home fourth to Canford Cliffs by two and one quarter lengths. Back in France contesting the three-year old only Prix Jean Prat Siyouni managed his best finish of the year in second place four lengths down to the winnner. Taking on older horses for the first time Siyouni tackled the Prix du Moulin de Longchamp and came extremely close to a second Group One win finishing third to Fuisse and Rio De La Plata all finishing within a head of each other. Siyouni's last race of his career would see him run in the Prix de la Forêt ran on France's renowned Arc Weekend, he failed to mount any serious challenge though and finished a lacklustre seventh of ten runners. After this race Siyouni would be retired to stand at stud

Stud career
Siyouni was retired to the Aga Khan IV's Haras de Bonneval stud in France after his 2010 season, initially standing for a fee of €7,000. Over the past  eight years Siyouni has established himself as one of the top sires in Europe. Siyouni's first black type winner was Ervedya winning the Prix de Cabourg Group Three also for the Aga Khan IV, she would also go on to be her sires first Group One winner giving Siyouni a prestigious first three-year old crop French Classic Races winner. He has gone on to produce six Group One winners, four of which are multiple Group one winners and a further fifty-one stakes winners. His rise in success over recent years has seen his stud fee increase to €20,000 for 2015, €30,000 for 2016, €45,000 for 2017, €75,000 2018, €100,000 for 2019 then finally to €140,000 in 2021 and onwards. His most notable progeny is St Mark's Basilica who won five consecutive Group One's including the French 2000 Guineas and French Derby along with beating older horses for his last two Group One wins.

Notable progeny
c = colt, f = filly, g = gelding

Pedigree

Siyouni is inbred 4 × 4 to Northern Dancer, meaning that this stallion appears twice in the fourth generation of his pedigree.

References 

French racehorses